The NZWPW Tag Team Championship was the top professional wrestling tag team championship title in the New Zealand promotion New Zealand Wide Pro Wrestling. The title was first won by The Superlatives (Jean Miracle and Nick Silver), who won a tournament final at Power Play IV in Lower Hutt, New Zealand to win the titles on 14 April 2007. It was the first title of its kind to be established by a major promotion since the NWA Australasian Tag Team Championship during the early 1980s and remains the oldest currently active tag team championship in New Zealand. 

The final champions were The Wainui Express (Hayden and Jade Priest), who were in their second reign. On 17 November 2018, at Capital Pro Wrestling's MitchellMania event, the title was deactivated when NZWPW owner Martin Stirling was seen taking the NZWPW Heavyweight Championship from the then current champion Bryant and the promotion went into a hiatus. In 2018, the NZWPW promotion was closed as Stirling retired. Stirling announced over a telephone call that the final champions, The Wainui Express currently own the title belts.

Title history

List of combined reigns

References

External links
New Zealand Wide Pro Wrestling's official title history page

Tag team wrestling championships
Regional professional wrestling championships
Professional wrestling in New Zealand